The 2014 Redbridge Council election took place on 22 May 2014 to elect members of Redbridge Council in England. This was on the same day as other local elections.

Results
Labour won control from "No Overall Control". Labour won 35 seats (+9), The Conservatives won 25 seats (-5) and the Liberal Democrats won 3 seats (-4).

It was the first time in the borough's history that Labour had won a majority of seats on the council.

References

Redbridge
2014